McDole is a surname. Notable people with the surname include:

Mardye McDole (born 1959), American football player
Ron McDole (born 1939), American football player

See also
Shooting of Jeremy McDole